Ed McGaa (April 16, 1936 -  Aug. 25, 2017)  was an American new age author,   workshop leader, and military veteran.

Life
McGaa was born on the Pine Ridge Indian Reservation in South Dakota as a member of the Oglala Lakota. He served in the Marines in Korea, and as a fighter pilot in the Vietnam War, flying 110 combat missions, receiving 8 Air Medals and 2 Crosses of Gallantry. He was recommended for a Distinguished Flying Cross.

He received his bachelor's degree from Saint John's University and a law degree from the University of South Dakota. He participated in the Sun Dance ceremony with Frank Fools Crow. Later in life he wrote books and led workshops on spirituality.

Works
 Reminiscences of Lorraine Three Legs, Standing Rock Sioux Tribe of South Dakota, 1969. Oral History
 Red Cloud, Minneapolis: Dillon Press, 1971. 
 Mother Earth Spirituality : native American paths to healing ourselves and our world, San Francisco : Harper & Row, 1990. 
 Rainbow Tribe: ordinary people journeying on the red road, San Francisco: Harper, 1992. 
 
 Eagle Vision: Return of the Hoop, Minneapolis, MN : Four Directions Publishing, 1998. 
 Crazy Horse and Chief Red Cloud, Rapid City, South Dakota: Four Directions Publishing, 2004.

References

1936 births
2017 deaths
American male non-fiction writers
American non-fiction writers
Native American writers
St. John's University (New York City) alumni
University of South Dakota alumni
People from the Pine Ridge Indian Reservation, South Dakota
Native American United States military personnel
United States Marine Corps officers
United States Marine Corps personnel of the Korean War
United States Marine Corps personnel of the Vietnam War
American Vietnam War pilots
Oglala people